Rathna may refer to:
 Rathna (film), a 1998 Tamil language film
 Rathna (actress) (born 1948), Indian actress